Lagerstroemia floribunda, also known as Thai crape myrtle and kedah bungor, is a species of flowering plant in the family Lythraceae. It is native of the tropical region of Southeast Asia.

In Thailand, it is the provincial tree of Saraburi Province.

Gallery

References

External links

floribunda
Flora of Indo-China
Flora of Malaya